Joshua Johnson (born 1884; date of death unknown) was an English football goalkeeper who played in the Football League for Nottingham Forest and in the Southern League for Crystal Palace and Plymouth Argyle. Outside football, Johnson was a lay preacher.

Career
Johnson was born in Tibshelf, Derbyshire and began his career with local club Ripley Athletic. He signed for Aston Villa, in 1905, but moved on to Plymouth Argyle in 1906, without making a senior appearance. Johnson spent one season at Plymouth (7 appearances) before signing for Crystal Palace in November 1907. He went on to make 276 appearances for Palace in the Southern League up until the start of World War I. In 1919, he moved on to Nottingham Forest, then of the Football League second division, where he made 53 appearances in all competitions over the following two seasons. He then ended his career with Sutton United. During his time with Palace, Johnson represented the Southern League on three occasions.

References

External links
Josh Johnson at holmesdale.net
Josh Johnson at greensonscreen

1884 births
Year of death missing
People from Tibshelf
Footballers from Derbyshire
English footballers
Association football goalkeepers
Aston Villa F.C. players
Plymouth Argyle F.C. players
Crystal Palace F.C. players
Nottingham Forest F.C. players
Sutton United F.C. players
English Football League players
Southern Football League players
Southern Football League representative players